Podocoma is a genus of South American plants in the tribe Astereae within the family Asteraceae.

 Species
 Podocoma bellidifolia Baker - Brazil, Argentina, Paraguay
 Podocoma blanchetiana Baker - Brazil, Argentina, Paraguay
 Podocoma hieracifolia (Poir.) Cass. - Bolivia, Brazil, Argentina, Paraguay, Uruguay
 Podocoma hirsuta (Hook. & Arn.) Baker - Brazil, Argentina, Paraguay, Uruguay
 Podocoma notobellidiastrum (Griseb.) G.L.Nesom - Bolivia, Brazil, Argentina, Paraguay, Uruguay
 Podocoma regnellii Baker - Paraná
 Podocoma rivularis (Gardner) G.L.Nesom - Brazil, Argentina, Paraguay, Uruguay
 Podocoma spegazzinii Cabrera - Uruguay, Salta, Santa Catarina

 formerly included
Transferred to other genera: Asteropsis, Ixiochlamys

References

Astereae
Asteraceae genera
Flora of South America